Madin (also Romanized as Madīn) is a village in Dalfard Rural District, Sarduiyeh District, Jiroft County, Kerman Province, Iran. At the 2006 census, its population was 101, in 20 families.

References 

Populated places in Jiroft County